Mountain View is a census-designated place (CDP) in Hawaii County, Hawaii, United States located in the District of Puna. The population was 3,924 at the 2010 census, up from 2,799 at the 2000 census.

Geography
Mountain View is located on the east side of the island of Hawaii, also known as the Big Island, at  (19.539730, -155.141348). It is bordered by Kurtistown to the northeast, Hawaiian Acres to the east, Fern Acres and Eden Roc to the southeast, Fern Forest to the south, and Volcano to the southwest. Hawaii Route 11 runs through the southeast side of the community, leading north  to Hilo and southwest 15 miles to Hawaii Volcanoes National Park.

Climate

|Jan rain inch = 12.69	
|Feb rain inch = 16.99	
|Mar rain inch = 20.88	
|Apr rain inch = 21.14	
|May rain inch = 15.62	
|Jun rain inch = 9.69	
|Jul rain inch = 12.88	
|Aug rain inch = 15.29	
|Sep rain inch = 9.92	
|Oct rain inch = 12.84	
|Nov rain inch = 19.79	
|Dec rain inch = 17.87

|Jan snow inch = 	
|Feb snow inch = 	
|Mar snow inch = 	
|Apr snow inch = 	
|May snow inch = 	
|Jun snow inch = 	
|Jul snow inch = 	
|Aug snow inch = 	
|Sep snow inch = 	
|Oct snow inch = 	
|Nov snow inch = 	
|Dec snow inch =

|Jan record high F = 87	
|Feb record high F = 86	
|Mar record high F = 85	
|Apr record high F = 83	
|May record high F = 84	
|Jun record high F = 90	
|Jul record high F = 85	
|Aug record high F = 88	
|Sep record high F = 87	
|Oct record high F = 87	
|Nov record high F = 84	
|Dec record high F = 87

|Jan record low F = 43	
|Feb record low F = 38	
|Mar record low F = 45	
|Apr record low F = 47	
|May record low F = 49	
|Jun record low F = 49	
|Jul record low F = 52	
|Aug record low F = 52	
|Sep record low F = 51	
|Oct record low F = 48	
|Nov record low F = 47	
|Dec record low F = 42

|Jan precipitation days = 19	
|Feb precipitation days = 20	
|Mar precipitation days = 25	
|Apr precipitation days = 26	
|May precipitation days = 27	
|Jun precipitation days = 25	
|Jul precipitation days = 27	
|Aug precipitation days = 27	
|Sep precipitation days = 23	
|Oct precipitation days = 24	
|Nov precipitation days = 23	
|Dec precipitation days = 23

|source 1 = WRCC
}}

Demographics

At the 2010 census, there were 3,924 people in 1,318 households residing in the CDP. The racial makeup of the CDP was 24.90% White, 0.38% African American, 0.71% American Indian and Alaska Native, 16.00% Asian, 9.89% Native Hawaiian and Pacific Islander, 1.68% from other races, and 46.43% from two or more races. Hispanic or Latino of any race were 20.41% of the population.

Of the 1,318 households, 34.6% had children under the age of 18 living with them.  The average household size was 2.98.

In the Mountain View CDP the population was spread out, with 29.6% under the age of 18, 8.8% from 18 to 24, 12.4% from 25 to 34, 18.0 from 35 to 49, 21.5% from 50 to 64, and 9.7% 65 or older.  For every 100 females, there were 96.9 males.  For every 100 males there were 103.2 females.

The median household income was $26,860 and the median income in 2000 for a family was $33,750. Males had a median income in 2000 of $24,250 versus $22,135 for females. The per capita income for the CDP in 2000 was $13,229.  About 23.6% of families and 30.3% of the population were below the poverty line in 2000, including 45.7% of those under age 18 and 5.0% of those age 65 or over.

References

Census-designated places in Hawaii County, Hawaii
Populated places on Hawaii (island)